Ana Rodrigues may refer to:
 Ana Rodrigues (swimmer)
 Ana Rodrigues (settler)
 Ana Paula Rodrigues, Brazilian gymnast